Aq Sin Tappeh (also Romanized as Āq Sīn Tappeh) is a village in Jafarbay-ye Sharqi Rural District, Gomishan District, Torkaman County, Golestan Province, Iran. At the 2006 census, its population was 216, in 48 families.

References 

Populated places in Torkaman County